In the Name of Love is the seventeenth studio album by Earth, Wind & Fire, released in July 1997 on Rhino Records. The album reached No. 19 on the UK R&B Albums chart and No. 25 on the Japanese Oricon Albums Chart.

Overview
In the Name of Love was produced by EWF's leader Maurice White for Kalimba Productions. Originally the album was released in Japan during 1996 as Avatar.

During October 2006 In the Name of Love was reissued on Maurice White's own label Kalimba Music. With the LP's reissue came three bonus tracks from Avatar being "Change Your Mind", "Take You to Heaven" and "Bahia".

Covers
EWF covered the tune "Love Is Life" on the album. "Love Is Life" first appeared on the band 's 1971 self-titled debut LP.

Appearances in other media
EWF went on to contribute the song "Cruisin'" to the soundtrack to the 1996 feature film Get On the Bus.

Critical reception

With a four out of five star rating Dan Glaister of The Guardian called In The Name Of Love "a scorching album". Omoronke Idowu of Vibe wrote "In the Name of Love is like revisiting a fresh yet familiar face, one that soothes, satisfies, and makes you smile from the inside out. With a 6 out of 10 rating Al Rasheed Dauda of Vox exclaimed "this album proves they're as potent as ever". Steve Jones of USA Today noted that EWF "shows it still has an edge to its funk". 

David Stubbs of Uncut gave a three out of five star rating and affirmed "In the Name of Love is never less than good, always less than vital". Alex Henderson of Allmusic gave a 3.5 out of 5 star rating and proclaimed "this excellent CD is unapologetically retro." Phyl Garland of Stereo Review gave a four out of five star rating and wrote "with this set of skillfully shaped songs, White has positioned Earth, Wind & Fire to move into the next century".

Singles
"Change Your Mind" rose to No. 26 on the Billboard Adult R&B Songs chart. 
"When Love Goes Wrong" also reached No. 33 on the Billboard Adult R&B Songs chart.

Track listing

Avatar

In the Name of Love

2006 Kalimba Reissue

Credits
Backing Vocals – Carl Carwell (tracks: 1 to 3, 5 to 10), Doni McCrary (tracks: 4), Howard McCrary (tracks: 4), James McCrary (tracks: 4), Kevin Guillaume (tracks: 5), Leon McCrary (tracks: 4), Ralph Hawkins, Jr. (tracks: 5), Sir James Bailey (tracks: 1, 3)
Bass – Verdine White
Composer - Alan Glass, Andrew Klippel, Betty Reynolds, Damian Johnson, Don Whitehead, Kevin Guillaume, Maurice White, Melanie Andrews, Morris Pleasure, Paul Minor, Philip Bailey, Sheldon M. Reynolds, Ralph Hawkins, Jr., Ralph Tresvant, Roxanne Seeman, Sir James Bailey, Sonny Emory, Verdine White, Wade Flemons 
Drums, Backing Vocals – Sonny Emory
Guitar, Lead Vocals, Backing Vocals – Sheldon Reynolds
Keyboards – Andrew Klippel (tracks: 4), Damian Johnson (tracks: 5), Marcel East (tracks: 11), Morris Pleasure, Paul Minor (tracks: 5, 6, 8)
Lead Vocals, Backing Vocals – Philip Bailey
Mastered By – Wally Traugott
Percussion – David Romero (tracks: 9), Lenny Castro (tracks: 1, 2, 8, 9), Paulinho Da Costa  (tracks: 6, 11)
Percussion, Backing Vocals – Ralph Johnson
Producer, Lead Vocals [Additional], Backing Vocals – Maurice White
Programmed By – Jimmy Randolph (tracks: 2, 6, 9, 10)
Recorded By, Mixed By – Don Murry
Saxophone – Scott Mayo (tracks: 1, 2, 3, 5, 7, 8, 10, 11)
Trombone – Bill Reichenbach (tracks: 1, 5, 8), Reggie Young (tracks: 2, 3, 7, 10)
Trumpet – Michael Stewart (tracks: 2, 3, 7, 10), Ray Brown (tracks: 2, 3, 7, 10)
Trumpet, Flugelhorn – Gary Grant (tracks: 1, 5, 8), Jerry Hey (tracks: 1, 5, 8)

Charts
Album

Singles

References

1997 albums
Earth, Wind & Fire albums
Albums produced by Maurice White
Rhino Records albums